Leonardo Natale (born 25 October 1958) is an Italian former road cyclist, who competed as a professional from 1978 to 1985.

He won the Cima Coppi title in the 1979 Giro d'Italia through being the first rider over the Pordoi Pass on stage 17.

Major results
1976
 1st Trofeo Emilio Paganessi
1977
 2nd Gran Premio Industria e Commercio Artigianato Carnaghese
1980
 9th Giro del Lazio
 10th Overall Giro d'Italia
1981
 3rd Overall Tour de Suisse
 10th Giro dell'Appennino
1982
 8th GP du canton d'Argovie

Grand Tour general classification results timeline

References

External links

1958 births
Living people
Italian male cyclists
People from Saronno
Cyclists from the Province of Varese